Ministry of Public Health station is a Bangkok MRT station on the Purple Line. The station opened on 6 August 2016 and is located on Tiwanon road in Nonthaburi Province. The station has four entrances. It is located near the headquarters of the Ministry of Public Health, in front of Srithanya Hospital.

References 

MRT (Bangkok) stations